Ancyrocephalidae is a family of monogenean flatworms. The family is considered as a "temporary name" in WorMS  but includes a large number of genera and species.

Genera

Actinocleidus Mueller, 1937 
Aethycteron Suriano & Beverley-Burton, 1982 
Ameloblastella Kritsky, Mendoza-Franco & Scholz, 2000 
Anchoradiscoides Rogers, 1967 
Anchoradiscus Mizelle, 1941 
Ancyrocephaloides Yamaguti, 1938
Ancyrocephalus Creplin, 1839
Androspira Suriano, 1981
Annulotrema Paperna & Thurston, 1969
Aphanoblastella Kritsky, Mendoza-Franco & Scholz,  2000
Aristocleidus Mueller, 1936 

Atherinicus Bychowsky & Nagibina, 1969
Bravohollisia Bychowsky & Nagibina, 1970
Caballeria Bychowsky & Nagibina, 1970
Cacatuocotyle Boeger, Domingues & Kritsky, 1997
Characithecium Mendoza-Franco, Reina & Torchin, 2009
Chauhanellus Bychowsky & Nagibina, 1969
Cichlidogyrus Paperna, 1960

Clavunculus Mizelle, Stokely, Jaskoski, Seamster & Monaco, 1956
Cleidodiscus Mueller, 1934
Cleithrarticus Mizelle, 1963
Cosmetocleithrum Kritsky, Thatcher & Boeger, 1986 
Crinicleidus Beverley-Burton, 1986
Diaphorocleidus Jogunoori, Kritsky & Venkatanarasaiah, 2004
Diplectanotrema Johnston & Tiegs, 1922
Diversohamulus Bychowsky & Nagibina, 1969
Enterogyrus Paperna, 1963 
Euryhaliotrema Kritsky & Boeger, 2002
Glandulocephalus Unnithan, 1972
Glyphidohaptor Kritsky, Galli & Yang, 2007
Gobioecetes Ogawa & Ito, 2017
Guavinella Mendoza-Franco, Scholz & Cabañas-Carranza, 2003
Haliotrema Johnston & Tiegs, 1922
Haliotrematoides Kritsky, Yang & Sun, 2009
Haplocleidus Mueller, 1937
Hareocephalus Young, 1968
Helicirrus Corlis, 2004
Hemirhamphiculus Bychowsky & Nagibina, 1970
Heteropriapulus Kritsky, 2007
Iliocirrus Corlis, 2004
Insulacleidus Rakotofiringa & Euzet, 1983
Kriboetrema Sarabeev, Rubtsova, Yang & Balbuena, 2013
Lethrinitrema Lim & Justine, 2011 
Ligictaluridus Beverley-Burton, 1984
Ligophorus Euzet & Suriano, 1977
Linguadactyla Brinkmann, 1940
Longidigitis Corlis, 2004
Marumbius Boeger, Ferreira, Vianna & Patella, 2014
Metahaliotrema Yamaguti, 1953
Mexicana Caballero & Bravo-Hollis, 1959 
Mexicotrema Lamothe-Argumedo, 1969
Micronococotyle Kritsky, Aquaro & Galli, 2010
Mizelleus Jain, 1957
Neodiplectanotrema Gerasev, Gaevskaja & Kovaleva, 1987
Neohaliotrema Yamaguti, 1965
Onchobdella Paperna, 1968

 Octouncuhaptor Mendoza-Franco, Roche & Torchin, 2008 
Onchocleidus Mueller, 1936
Palombitrema Price & Bussing, 1968
Paracosmetocleithrum Acosta, Scholz, Blasco-Costa, Alves & da Silva, 2017
Paradiplectanotrema Gerasev, Gayevskaya & Kovaleva, 1987
Parahemirhamphiculus Bychowsky & Nagibina, 1969
Parancylodiscoides Caballero & Bravo Hollis, 1961
Parancyrocephaloides Yamaguti, 1938
Paraneohaliotrema Zhukov, 1976
Parasciadicleithrum Mendoza-Palmero, Blasco-Costa, Hernández-Mena & Pérez-Ponce de León, 2017
Pennulituba Řehulková, Justine & Gelnar, 2010 
Placodiscus Paperna, 1972 (not Placodiscus, a plant)
Protancyrocephaloides Burn, 1978
Protoancyrocephalus Bychowsky, 1957
Pseudamphibdella Yamaguti, 1958
Pseudempleurosoma Yamaguti, 1965
Pseudodactylogyroides Ogawa, 1986
Pseudodiplectanotrema Gerasev, Gaevskaja & Kovaleva, 1987
Pseudohaliotrema Yamaguti, 1953
Pseudotetrancistrum Caballero & Bravo-Hollis, 1961
Recurvatus Corlis, 2004
Salsuginus Beverley-Burton, 1984
Sciadicleithrum Kritsky, Thatcher & Boeger, 1989
Sclerocleidoides Agrawal, Yadav & Kritsky, 2001
Scutogyrus Pariselle & Euzet, 1995

Sundatrema Lim& Gibson, 2009
Susanlimae Boeger, Pariselle & Patella, 2015 
Syncleithrium Price, 1967
Tereancistrum Kritsky, Thatcher & Kayton, 1980
Tetracleidus Mueller, 1936
Tetrancistrum Goto & Kikuchi, 1917
Thylacicleidus Wheeler & Klassen, 1988
Triacanthinella Bychowsky & Nagibina, 1968
Tribaculocauda Tripathi, 1959
Tylosuricola Unnithan, 1964
Urocleidoides Mizelle & Price, 1964
Urocleidus Mueller, 1934
Vancleaveus Kritsky, Thatcher & Boeger, 1986
Volsellituba Řehulková, Justine & Gelnar, 2010 
Xenoligophoroides Dmitrieva, Sanna, Piras, Garippa & Merella, 2018

References

 
Animal parasites of fish
Platyhelminthes families